Zawiya (institution) is an Islamic religious school or monastery.

Zawiya, Zawiyah, Zawia, Zaouia, Zaouiet and similar terms may also refer to:

Places

Algeria
 Aïn Zaouia, an Algerian town
 Mazer Zaouia, an Algerian village
 Zaouia El Abidia, an Algerian town
 Zaouia el Kbira, an Algerian village
 Zaouia Foukania, an Algerian village
 Zaouia Sidi Moussa, an Algerian village
 Zaouiet Kounta, an Algerian town
 Zaouiet Kounta District, an Algerian district
 Zawiya Thaalibia, an Algerian zawiya in the Casbah of Algiers
 Zawiya Thaalibia, an Algerian zawiya in the Issers
 Zawiyas in Algeria, an Algerian Islamic topic
 Zawiyet El Hamel, a Sufi zawiya in Algeria
 Zawiyet Sidi Amar Cherif, a Sufi zawiya in Algeria
 Zawiyet Sidi Boumerdassi, a Sufi zawiya in Algeria
 Zawiyet Sidi Boushaki, a Sufi zawiya in Algeria

Egypt
 Zawyet El Aryan, an Egyptian town
 Unfinished Northern Pyramid of Zawyet El Aryan, an Egyptian pyramid
 Zawyat Razin, an Egyptian city

Israel
 Khirbat Zawiya, a Palestinian Arab village in Baysan, depopulated in 1948
 Zawiya, Safad, a Palestinian Arab village depopulated in 1948

Libya
 Zawiya District, (officially Zawia) a district in the west of Libya
 Zawiya, Libya, (officially Zawia) the capital city of that district

Palestine
 Az-Zawiya, Salfit, a Palestinian town in Salfit Governorate, West Bank
 As-Sawiya, a Palestinian town in Nablus Governorate, West Bank
 Zawiya, Jenin, a Palestinian village in Jenin Governorate, West Bank

Syria
 Zawiya Mountain, a highland region in Syria